U.S. Route 12 (US 12) is a part of the United States Numbered Highway System that travels from Aberdeen, Washington, to Detroit, Michigan. In the state of North Dakota, US 12 extends from the Montana border east to the South Dakota border.

Route description
Throughout the state, US 12 is a two-lane undivided highway that runs through Adams, Bowman, and Slope counties in southwest North Dakota. US 12 meets with US 85 in Bowman, and the routes run concurrently for a short distance through the city.

History

Major intersections

See also

References

External links

12
 North Dakota
Transportation in Bowman County, North Dakota
Transportation in Slope County, North Dakota
Transportation in Adams County, North Dakota